Kachalvand (also Romanized as Kachalvand; also known as Kachālvand-e Pāpī and Kechālvand-e Pāpī) is a village in Dowreh Rural District, Chegeni District, Dowreh County, Lorestan Province, Iran. At the 2006 census, its population was 142, in 27 families.

References 

Towns and villages in Dowreh County